The 1971 Troy State Red Wave football team represented Troy State University (now known as Troy University) as a member of the Gulf South Conference (GSC) during the 1971 NAIA Division I football season. Led by sixth-year head coach Billy Atkins, the Red Wave compiled an overall record of 6–3 with a mark of 5–1 in conference play, sharing the GSC title with Livingston.

Schedule

References

Troy State
Troy Trojans football seasons
Gulf South Conference football champion seasons
Troy State Trojans football